Ishak Guebli (born 25 April 1987) is an Algerian footballer who plays for NA Hussein Dey in the Algerian Ligue Professionnelle 1 as a centre back.

References

External links

1987 births
Living people
Association football defenders
Algerian footballers
Algerian Ligue Professionnelle 1 players
USM El Harrach players
CR Belouizdad players
NA Hussein Dey players
RC Relizane players
USM Bel Abbès players
US Biskra players
People from Bordj El Kiffan
21st-century Algerian people